The Ballad of Hard Times is a Canadian documentary film, directed by Richard Boutet and Pascal Gélinas and released in 1983. The film documents the effects of the Great Depression in Quebec through the testimonies of survivors of the period; the film takes its name from its soundtrack of popular Depression-era Quebec folk music, including the songs of La Bolduc.

The film won the Prix L.-E.-Ouimet-Molson from the Association québécoise des critiques de cinéma, and received a Genie Award nomination for Best Feature Length Documentary at the 5th Genie Awards in 1984.

References

External links
 

1983 films
1983 documentary films
Canadian documentary films
Great Depression films
Quebec films
Documentary films about poverty in Canada
French-language Canadian films
1980s Canadian films